Andre Schmid may refer to:

 Andre Schmid (soccer) (born 1983), former American soccer player
 Andre Schmid (academic), Canadian academic and author
 Andy Schmid (born 1983), Swiss handball player